HMS Cerberus was a 28 gun sixth-rate frigate of the Royal Navy.

Construction
She was ordered on 6 May 1757 from the yards of Pleasant Fenn, East Cowes and was laid down on 13 June 1757. She was launched just over a year later on 5 September 1758.

The frigate was named after Cerberus, the multi-headed dog from Greek mythology that reputedly guarded the doors to Hades. The choice of name followed a trend initiated in 1748 by John Montagu, 4th Earl of Sandwich, in his capacity as First Lord of the Admiralty, of using figures from classical antiquity as descriptors for naval vessels. A total of six Coventry-class vessels were named in this manner; a further ten were named after geographic features including regions, English or Irish rivers, or towns.

In sailing qualities Cerberus was broadly comparable with French frigates of equivalent size, but with a shorter and sturdier hull and greater weight in her broadside guns. She was also comparatively broad-beamed with ample space for provisions and the ship's mess, and incorporating a large magazine for powder and round shot. Taken together, these characteristics would enable Cerberus to remain at sea for long periods without resupply. She was also built with broad and heavy masts, which balanced the weight of her hull, improved stability in rough weather and made her capable of carrying a greater quantity of sail. The disadvantages of this comparatively heavy design were a decline in manoeuvrability and slower speed when sailing in light winds.

Her designated complement was 200, comprising two commissioned officers  a captain and a lieutenant  overseeing 40 warrant and petty officers, 91 naval ratings, 38 Marines and 29 servants and other ranks. Among these other ranks were four positions reserved for widow's men  fictitious crew members whose pay was intended to be reallocated to the families of sailors who died at sea.

Naval career

Cerberus saw action in the American Revolutionary War.  One of its first duties was to dispatch generals William Howe, Henry Clinton, and John Burgoyne to Boston after the Battles of Lexington and Concord.  The American press likened the three generals to the three-headed dog that was the ship's namesake. It provided naval reinforcement at the Battle of Bunker Hill. The ship was the target of an early torpedo attack by David Bushnell's newly developed powder keg torpedoes in 1777. The attack killed four sailors in a small boat, but did not severely damage the ship.

Cerberus was eventually burnt to prevent being captured by the French on 5 August 1778 during the American War of Independence, in Narragansett Bay in Rhode Island. The remains of the Cerberus are now part of a site listed on the National Register of Historic Places, the "Wreck Sites of HMS Cerberus and HMS Lark."

Notes

References

Bibliography

External links
 

 

Sixth-rate frigates of the Royal Navy
Archaeology of shipwrecks
1758 ships
Ships built on the Isle of Wight
Shipwrecks of the Rhode Island coast
Maritime incidents in 1778